Richard Phillip Colella, Jr. (born December 14, 1951) is an American former breaststroke swimmer who represented the United States at two consecutive Summer Olympics, starting in 1972.

Colella's sister Lynn was also an Olympic swimmer. In 1971 Richard and Lynn won the Seattle Post-Intelligencer Man of the Year award.

Colella finished fourth in the final of the men's 200-meter breaststroke at the 1972 Summer Olympics in Munich, Germany.  At the 1976 Summer Olympics in Montreal, Quebec, he finished third and received the bronze medal in the 200-meter breaststroke, his signature event.

Colella and his wife Terry have raised four children, Elise, Mariel, Brian and Angie.  For the past seven years, the Colellas have dedicated themselves to raising money for research to find a cure for facioscapulohumeral disease (FSHD), a common form of muscular dystrophy that affects their son Brian. They formed FSH Friends, an organization that they run out of their home.  They work to raise money and put on an annual auction gala that takes place in the end of January. They've also co-sponsored local workshops, bringing researchers together from around the world, to help move the research forward.

See also
 List of Olympic medalists in swimming (men)
 List of University of Washington people
 List of World Aquatics Championships medalists in swimming (men)

References

 

1951 births
Living people
American male breaststroke swimmers
Olympic bronze medalists for the United States in swimming
Pan American Games gold medalists for the United States
Swimmers from Seattle
Swimmers at the 1971 Pan American Games
Swimmers at the 1972 Summer Olympics
Swimmers at the 1975 Pan American Games
Swimmers at the 1976 Summer Olympics
Washington Huskies men's swimmers
World Aquatics Championships medalists in swimming
Medalists at the 1976 Summer Olympics
Pan American Games silver medalists for the United States
Pan American Games bronze medalists for the United States
Pan American Games medalists in swimming
Universiade medalists in swimming
Universiade gold medalists for the United States
Universiade silver medalists for the United States
Medalists at the 1970 Summer Universiade
Medalists at the 1971 Pan American Games
Medalists at the 1975 Pan American Games